KNW may refer to:

KNW, the IATA and FAA LID code for New Stuyahok Airport, an airport in New Stuyahok, Alaska, United States
KNW, the National Rail code for Kenilworth railway station, Warwickshire, England